The Bank of Sierra Leone is the central bank of Sierra Leone. It issues the country's currency, known as the Leone.  The bank formulates and implements monetary policy, including foreign exchange.

Organisation and activities 

The current governor of the Bank of Sierra Leone is Kelfala M. Kallon, who was appointed by president Julius Maada Bio, and took office in 2018 after he was approved by Parliament. The governor of the bank is appointed by the President of Sierra Leone for a term of five years.

The Bank Headquarters is at Siaka Stevens Street in the Central business district in Downtown Freetown.

The Bank is engaged in policies to promote financial inclusion and is a member of the Alliance for Financial Inclusion (AFI). On 20 December 2012, the member institution announced specific commitments toward AFI's Maya Declaration to move further toward the eradication of financial exclusion in Sierra Leone.

Governors
Gordon E. Hall, 1963–1966
Samuel Bamidele Nicol-Cole, 1966–1970
Samuel Lansana Bangura, 1970–1979
Arthur Salaco Christopher Johnson, 1979-1980-?
Jim Fornah, 1981–1985
Victor Bruce, 1985–1986
Abdul Rahman Turay, 1987-1992-?
Stephen Mustapha Swaray, 1993–1997
Christian Kargbo, 1997–1998
James Sanpha Koroma, 1998–2003
G. Melvin Tucker, acting, 2003
James David Rogers, 2003–2007
Samura Kamara, 2007–2009
Sheku Sambadeen Sesay, 2009–2014
Momodu Kargbo, 2014–2016
Kaifala Marah, 2016–2017
Patrick Saidu Conteh, 2017–2018
Kelfala M. Kallon, 2018-

History

In order to create an independent economy for the new country, the government drafted legislation to create a central bank and a new currency. The enabling legislation was passed on 27 March 1963 and the bank began operations on 4 August 1964. At the same time, the Leone was introduced to replace the British West African pound, using a decimal system of currency.

See also 

 Sierra Leonean leone
 Sierra Leone Ministry of Finance
 Banking in Sierra Leone
 Economy of Sierra Leone
 List of banks in Sierra Leone
 List of central banks of Africa
 List of central banks

References

External links 

 
 Bank of Sierra Leone on the Sierra Leone Encyclopedia 2006

Banks of Sierra Leone
Government of Sierra Leone
Sierra Leone
1963 establishments in Sierra Leone
Banks established in 1963
Companies based in Freetown